George Colin McKee (October 2, 1837 – November 17, 1890) was a U.S. Representative from Mississippi.

Biography
Born in Joliet, Illinois, Mckee attended Knox College and Lombard College, both in Galesburg, Illinois, where he studied law. He was admitted to the bar in 1858 and commenced practice in Centralia, Illinois. McKee served as city attorney of Centralia from 1858 to 1861. He served in the Eleventh Regiment, Illinois Volunteer Infantry during the Civil War. After the war, he resumed the practice of law in Vicksburg, Mississippi, and engaged in planting in Hinds County.
He was appointed register in bankruptcy in 1867.
He served as member of the State constitutional convention in 1868.

Mckee was elected as a Republican to the Fortieth Congress, but his credentials were never presented to the House.

Mckee was elected as a Republican to the Forty-first, Forty-second, and Forty-third Congresses (February 23, 1870 – March 3, 1875).

He served as chairman of the Committee on Territories (Forty-third Congress). After his congressional service, he resumed his law practice. He was appointed postmaster of Jackson, Mississippi, and served from June 28, 1881, to November 12, 1885. He served as receiver of public moneys from 1889 until his death in Jackson, Mississippi, on November 17, 1890.
He was interred in Greenwood Cemetery.

References

1837 births
1890 deaths
People from Joliet, Illinois
Union Army personnel
Republican Party members of the United States House of Representatives from Mississippi
19th-century American politicians